The year 1731 in science and technology involved some significant events.

Agriculture and horticulture
 Philip Miller publishes The Gardeners Dictionary, containing the Methods of Cultivating and Improving the Kitchen Fruit and Flower Garden in London.
 Jethro Tull publishes The New Horse-Houghing Husbandry; or, an essay on the principles of tillage and vegetation in London.

Astronomy
 John Bevis observes the Crab Nebula for the first time in the modern era.
 The octant is developed by John Hadley (it will eventually be replaced as an essential tool of navigation by the sextant).
 The orrery (or planetarium model) is developed as an apparatus showing the relative positions of heavenly bodies in the Solar System by using balls moved by wheelwork.

Geology
 The modern seismograph is developed by Italian scientist Nicholas Cerillo using a pendulum.

Mathematics
 The Euclidean distance formula is first published by Alexis Clairaut.

Medicine
 September – The first successful appendectomy is performed by English surgeon William Cookesley.
 Laura Bassi becomes the first official female university teacher on being appointed professor of anatomy at the University of Bologna at the age of 21.
 The  Society for the Improvement of Medical Knowledge in Edinburgh begins publication of the peer reviewed Medical Essays and Observations.

Technology
 The harpoon gun is developed and used for the purpose of throwing the harpoon into the body of whales.

Publications
 Publication begins in Augsburg and Ulm of Johann Jakob Scheuchzer's Physica Sacra which attempts to provide a scientific explanation of Biblical history.

Awards
 Copley Medal: The first Copley Medal is awarded to Stephen Gray.

Births
 October 10 – Henry Cavendish, English scientist (died 1810)
 November 9 – Benjamin Banneker, African-American astronomer and surveyor (died 1806)
 December 12 – Erasmus Darwin, English physician and botanist (died 1802)

Deaths
 January 6 – Étienne François Geoffroy, French chemist (born 1672)
 December 29 – Brook Taylor, English mathematician (born 1685)

References

 
18th century in science
1730s in science